Kalateh-ye Mirza Rahim (also Romanized as Kalāteh-ye Mīrzā Raḩīm) is a village in Azari Rural District, in the Central District of Esfarayen County, North Khorasan Province, Iran. At the 2006 census, its population was 780, in 176 families.

References 

Populated places in Esfarayen County